Turuvekere Assembly constituency is one of the 224 constituencies in the Karnataka Legislative Assembly of Karnataka a south state of India. It is also part of Tumkur Lok Sabha constituency.

Members of Legislative Assembly

Mysore State
 1951-1957: Seat did not exist
 1957: T. Subramanya, Praja Socialist Party
 1962: B. Hutchegowda, Praja Socialist Party
 1967: M. N. Ramanna, Indian National Congress
 1972: B. Bhyrappaji, Indian National Congress (Organisation)

Karnataka State
 1978: K. H. Ramakrishnaiah, Indian National Congress (Indira)
 1983: B. Bhyrappaji, Indian National Congress
 1985: K. H. Ramakrishnaiah, Janata Party
 1989: S. Rudrappa, Indian National Congress
 1994: H. B. Nanjegowda, Janata Dal
 1999: M. D. Lakshminarayana, Bharatiya Janata Party
 2004: M. T. Krishnappa, Janata Dal (Secular)
 2008: Jaggesh, Indian National Congress
 2008 (By-Poll): M. T. Krishnappa, Janata Dal (Secular)
 2013: M. T. Krishnappa, Janata Dal (Secular)
 2018: A. S. Jayaram, Bharatiya Janata Party

See also
 List of constituencies of Karnataka Legislative Assembly
 Tumkur district

References

Assembly constituencies of Karnataka
Tumkur district